A black market is a covert trade in illegal or stolen goods.

Black Market may also refer to:
 Black Market (Weather Report album), a 1976 album by Weather Report
 Black Market (Rick Ross album), a 2015 album by rapper Rick Ross
 "Black Market" (Battlestar Galactica), an episode of Battlestar Galactica
 Black Market (novel) or Black Friday, a 1986 novel by James Patterson
 Black Market Magazine, a defunct American entertainment magazine
 Black Market Music (record label), an Australian blues and roots-music label
 Blackmarket (film), a 1967 Indian film
 The Black Market (film), a 1953 Argentine crime film
 The Black Market (Rise Against album), a 2014 album by Punk Rock band Rise Against
 Back Market or Jung SAS, an e-commerce company in the refurbishment of electrical and electronic appliances.

See also 
 
 Black Marketing, a 1943 propaganda short film
 Black mark (disambiguation)